Miloš Marković may refer to:

 Miloš Marković (footballer born 1986), Serbian football player
 Miloš Marković (water polo) (1947-2010), Serbian water polo player (1972 and 1976 Olympics), winner of the 2000 Franjo Bučar State Award for Sport
 Miloš Marković (basketball), Serbian basketball player, played for KK Partizan in 2004-05
 Miloš Marković (footballer born 1992), Montenegrin football player